NCHA may refer to:

National Cultural Heritage Administration, an administrative agency subordinate to the Ministry of Culture and Tourism of the People's Republic of China. 
Northern Collegiate Hockey Association
National Cutting Horse Association